The 2016 Cape Town Summer Series was the first edition of the women's field hockey friendly series, comprising a number of test matches between the national teams of Germany, India, Scotland and the hosts, South Africa. The series was held at Hartleyvale Stadium in Cape Town, from 20 February to 5 March.

Germany finished in first place, topping the pool at the conclusion of the matches.

Results
All times are local (SAST).

Standings

Fixtures

Goalscorers

References

Women's field hockey competitions in South Africa
Sports competitions in Cape Town